Barry Jepson (29 December 1929 – 8 December 2001) was a footballer who played as a centre forward in the Football League for Mansfield Town, Chester and Southport.

References

1929 births
2001 deaths
People from Alfreton
Footballers from Derbyshire
Association football forwards
English footballers
Chesterfield F.C. players
South Normanton Athletic F.C. players
Ilkeston Town F.C. (1945) players
Mansfield Town F.C. players
Chester City F.C. players
Southport F.C. players
Alfreton Town F.C. players
English Football League players